The 1955 Norwegian Football Cup was the 50th season of the Norwegian annual knockout football tournament. The tournament was open for all members of NFF, except those from Northern Norway. The final was played at Ullevaal Stadion in Oslo on 23 October 1955, and was contested the defending champions Skeid, and Lillestrøm, who also lost the final in 1953. Skeid successfully defended their title with a 5–0 victory in the final.

First round

|-
|colspan="3" style="background-color:#97DEFF"|Replay

|}

Second round

|}

Third round

|colspan="3" style="background-color:#97DEFF"|25 June 1955

|-
|colspan="3" style="background-color:#97DEFF"|26 June 1955

|-
|colspan="3" style="background-color:#97DEFF"|28 June 1955

|-
|colspan="3" style="background-color:#97DEFF"|3 July 1955

|-
|colspan="3" style="background-color:#97DEFF"|Replay: 2 July 1955

|}

Fourth round

|colspan="3" style="background-color:#97DEFF"|20 August 1955

|-
|colspan="3" style="background-color:#97DEFF"|21 August 1955

|-
|colspan="3" style="background-color:#97DEFF"|Replay: 28 August 1955

|}

Quarter-finals

|colspan="3" style="background-color:#97DEFF"|4 September 1955

|}

Semi-finals

|colspan="3" style="background-color:#97DEFF"|3 October 1955

|}

Final

See also
1954–55 Norwegian Main League
1955 in Norwegian football

References

Norwegian Football Cup seasons
Norway
Cup